The Henry 180 is a NASCAR Xfinity Series race that has taken place at Road America since 2010. Henry Repeating Arms holds the naming rights to the race, and the pole and race winners are awarded matching, custom Henry 180 Edition Big Boy Lever-Action Rifles. Since the inception, the race has featured highly competitive races and is considered one of the most unpredictable races of the season.

History 
The track held its first Xfinity event in 2010 after the Milwaukee Mile's race was moved to the track. Road America had held a Grand National (now NASCAR Cup Series) race in the 1956 that was won by Tim Flock. Carl Edwards won the inaugural 50-lap race, named the Bucyrus 200, after holding off Canadian road course ringers, Jacques Villeneuve and Ron Fellows.

In 2011, the Bucyrus 200 was won by Reed Sorenson after a confusing series of events in which numerous drivers either crashed, were penalized, or ran out of gas. This was the first Xfinity Series race to require three green-white-checker finish attempts, extending the race to 57 laps. Michael McDowell was leading until he ran out of fuel on the first GWC-finish attempt, handing the lead to Justin Allgaier. A caution came out on the final lap which forced the race to end under yellow. Just after the yellow came out, Allgaier slowed down after running out of gas. When the dust settled, Ron Fellows appeared to have won the race, but, after a 10-minute delay, NASCAR determined that Fellows had made a pass on leader Reed Sorenson after a final-lap caution came out, handing the win to Sorenson and dropping Fellows to second.

The next year, in the newly renamed Sargento 200, Brazilian Nelson Piquet Jr. won his first career race ahead of Michael McDowell and Ron Fellows. In 2013, the once again renamed Johnsonville Sausage 200 pole winner was A. J. Allmendinger. Allmendinger, Owen Kelly, and Billy Johnson all took turns leading, with Allmendinger leading the most at 29. Allmendinger would go on to win the race after eight caution flags waved and the race was extended to 55 laps due to two green-white-checker finish attempts. The race became memorable when road course ringer, Max Papis got furious with Billy Johnson for spinning him out twice; on pit road Papis slapped Johnson and walked off grinning. The race was renamed as the Gardner Denver 200 for 2014.

In 2014 the race suffered rain, delaying the start by one hour. Despite this, NASCAR had the cars put on rain tires and race in the rain for the first time since 2009 in Montreal's NNS event. Sam Hornish Jr. led over 25 laps and dominated. However Alex Tagliani controlled the second half of the race. When he was about to take the white flag, a yellow flag period began. Just after the caution came out, Tagliani ran out of gas and stalled at the start/finish line. Brendan Gaughan prevailed after holding off a charge from deep in the pack by Tagliani for his first NNS win.

In 2015, the race was moved from June to the last weekend of August and it takes place during an off-weekend for the NASCAR Cup Series, the race was reduced from 202.4 miles to 182.16 miles for 2015. Paul Menard took advantage of Blake Koch's ignition troubles to hold off Ryan Blaney for an emotional victory near his hometown in Wisconsin. In 2016, road ringer Alex Tagliani won the pole while Michael McDowell led the final 24 laps en route to his first NASCAR win.

On March 1, 2017, it was announced that Johnsonville Foods would again take over naming rights, naming the 2017 event the Johnsonville 180.

On August 27, 2017, Truck Series regular Austin Cindric led the field to green after qualifying was cancelled. IndyCar driver James Davison won Stage One, while rookie Daniel Hemric won Stage Two. In the end, independent driver Jeremy Clements took the checkers for his first series win after surviving a late race crash with Matt Tifft. The following year, Xfinity Series regular Justin Allgaier took the victory in a redemption story from 2011.

CTECH Manufacturing and Henry Repeating Arms have also sponsored the race, doing so in 2019 and 2020 with the CTECH Manufacturing 180 and Henry 180, respectively.

Past winners 

2011, 2013, 2014, 2016, and 2022: Races extended due to NASCAR overtime.

Multiple winners (teams)

Manufacturer wins

References

External links

 

2010 establishments in Wisconsin
NASCAR Xfinity Series races
NASCAR races at Road America
Recurring sporting events established in 2010
Annual sporting events in the United States